Henry Barnard Kümmel (1867 - October 23, 1945) was a State Geologist for the State of New Jersey during the 20th century who worked extensively in the management of the Morris Canal after its acquisition by New Jersey.

Biography
Kümmel was born in 1867 in Milwaukee, Wisconsin.  His wife was Charlotte C. Kümmel. He studied geology under Rollin D. Salisbury at Beloit College, furthering his studies with graduate work at Harvard and the University of Chicago.

Kümmel was an elder at Prospect Street Church and sat on the judicial commission for the trial of Rev. Dr. J. Gresham Machen in 1935, but resigned his post before the conclusion of the trial.

Two quit board in Machen trial; Successors chosen after one of those named is said to sympathize with pastor.

Kümmel died 23 October 1945 at home in Trenton, New Jersey, following a lengthy illness.

Career
On May 12, 1908, Kümmel became the founding Chairman of the Association of American State Geologists (AASG) in Washington, DC.

In the 1930s, Kümmel compiled the "Henry B. Kümmel Collection" of photographs maintained by the New Jersey State Archives, including many historically significant images of the Morris Canal.

Kümmel's work on the Morris Canal also led the way for the preservation of the Pequannoc Spillway and Pompton Dam in Pequannock, NJ through his proclamation that to remove them would reduce the surrounding area to a series of "ill smelling mud flats," a statement quoted by consulting engineer Cornelius Clarkson Vermeule II upon his decision to preserve the structures.

As New Jersey State Geologist, Kümmel contributed to a large number of reports of great historic significance to the State of New Jersey, including the annual report for 1910, reports on the decommissioning of the Morris Canal, and a report describing glacial drift cited extensively by the New York Times.

Kümmel also served as Director of the Department of Conservation and Development, where on May 19, 1932 he presided over the acceptance of 2,500 plants for the George Washington Memorial Arboretum at Washington Crossing State Park from Charles Lathrop Pack and his son Arthur Newton Pack.

References

1867 births
1945 deaths
American geologists
Morris Canal
Fellows of the Geological Society of America
Harvard University alumni
Beloit College alumni
University of Chicago alumni